Drummondville is a city in the Centre-du-Québec region of Quebec, located east of Montreal on the Saint-François River. The population as of the Canada 2021 Census was 79,258. The mayor of Drummondville is Stéphanie Lacoste.

Drummondville is the seat of Drummond Regional County Municipality, and of the judicial district of Drummond.

History
Drummondville was founded in June 1815 by Lieutenant-Colonel Frederick Heriot. The purpose of the town was to provide a home for British soldiers in the War of 1812, and to guard the Saint-François (St Francis) River against American attacks. The town was named after Sir Gordon Drummond, the Lieutenant Governor of Upper Canada between 1813 and 1816.

The construction of the Hemmings Falls hydro-electric dam in 1920 brought a new wave of industrial growth to the Drummondville area.
Several outlying municipalities have been amalgamated into Drummondville since the 1950s:

1955: Saint-Joseph de Grantham, Saint-Jean-Baptiste
1966: Drummondville-Ouest
1982: Drummondville-Sud
1993: Grantham
2004: Saint-Nicéphore, Saint-Charles-de-Drummond, Saint-Joachim-de-Courval

Demographics 

In 2021, Drummondville was 92.7% white/European, 5.6% visible minorities and 1.7% Indigenous. The largest visible minority groups were Black (2.1%), Latin American (1.5%) and Arab (1.3%).

French was the mother tongue of 93.8% of the population. The next most common first languages were Spanish (1.4%), English (1.1%), and Arabic (0.9%). 0.7% of residents listed both French and English as mother tongues, while 0.4% listed both French and a non-official language.

71.9% of residents were Christian in 2021, down from 90.8% in 2011. 64.4% were Catholic, 5.6% were Christian n.o.s, 0.8% were Protestant, and 1.0% belonged to other Christian denominations or Christian-related traditions. 26.0% of the population was non-religious or secular, up from 8.4% in 2011. Other religions and spiritual traditions accounted for 2.0% of the population, up from 0.8% in 2011. The largest non-Christian religion was Islam (1.7%).

Attractions and culture
Drummondville markets itself as Quebec's Capital of Expression and Traditions, with attractions focusing on culture, both past and present. The main attractions are the Village Québécois d'Antan.

Since 2008 Drummondville hosts Festival de la Poutine, towards the end of August; during three days people are invited to attend concerts there, and to savour several kinds of poutine, a Canadian dish of provincial origin.

From 1982 to 2017, Drummondville was home to the Mondial des Cultures, one of the largest folk dance festivals in the world.

Climate
Drummondville has a humid continental climate (Dfb) with warm, rainy summers and cold, snowy winters.

Sports
Drummondville is home to the Quebec Major Junior Hockey League (QMJHL)'s Drummondville Voltigeurs, founded in 1982. The team plays its home games at Centre Marcel Dionne. Drummondville also has another arena, Olympia Yvan-Cournoyer.

Drummondville and Victoriaville co-hosted the 2013 World U-17 Hockey Challenge.

Prior to the Voltigeurs, Drummondville was home to the Drummondville Rangers of the QMJHL from 1969 to 1974.

Drummondville also was host to several baseball teams in the Quebec Provincial League in the 1940s and 1950s. The Drummondville Tigers in 1940, the Drummondville Cubs from 1948-1952, the Drummondville Royals in 1953, and the Drummondville A's in 1954.

The Autodrome Drummond holds various automotive races throughout the summer season.

La Courvalloise is used for tubing, skiing, and snowboarding.

Economy
Drummondville is home to the Promenades Drummondville regional shopping mall which has 109 stores.

MicroBird by Girardin has its headquarters in Drummondville.

Transportation

Highways
Drummondville is served by Autoroutes 20 and 55.

Local transit
Intra-city transit has been operated since 1987 by Drummondville Transit, which currently operates city bus services on six routes headquartered at the main bus terminal at Des Forges and Lindsay Streets. Service runs at half-hour intervals Monday to Saturday and hourly on Sundays.

Intercity buses
Intercity highway coach service is provided by Orléans Express and Groupe La Québécoise. Major destinations include the nearby cities of Montreal, Quebec City, Sherbrooke, Trois-Rivières, Victoriaville, Saint-Hyacinthe, and Thetford Mines.

Intercity rail
Passenger train service towards Montreal and Quebec City is provided by Via Rail. Drummondville is part of the high-traffic Quebec City–Windsor Corridor, and trains run at a rate of about five per day in either direction from the Drummondville railway station.

Air
General aviation services are available at the Drummondville Airport and the Drummondville Water Aerodrome.

Education
Drummondville is home to the Cégep de Drummondville, a public French-language CEGEP.
Drummondville is served by two school boards, the English-language Eastern Townships School Board and the French Centre de services scolaire des chenes.

Notable people
Louise Bédard, dancer and choreographer
Jean Bégin, ice hockey coach
Serge Boisvert, professional hockey player
Alex Bourret, professional hockey player
Yvan Cournoyer, professional hockey player
Gilbert Dionne, professional hockey player
Marcel Dionne, professional hockey player
Nancy Drolet, Olympic silver medalist in hockey
Jessica Dubé, Olympic ice skater
Robert Dupuis, 28th Canadian Surgeon General
Mickaël Gouin, actor and comedian
Alan Haworth, professional hockey player
Gordie Haworth, professional hockey player
Kaïn, musical group
Patrick Lalime, professional hockey player
Yvon Lambert, professional hockey player
Bernard Lemaire, businessman
Danick Martel, professional hockey player
Renée Martel, country singer
Éric Messier, professional hockey player
Louis Morissette, actor and screenwriter
Lester Patrick, professional hockey player
Jean-Luc Pepin, politician
Mathieu Perreault, professional hockey player
Michel Plante, professional hockey player
Kim Poirier, actress
Karine Vanasse, actress
John P. Webster, bank executive
A Perfect Murder, musical group
Les Trois Accords, musical group
Yves-François Blanchet, politician, Leader of the Bloc Québécois

Sister cities

 La Roche-sur-Yon, Vendée, Pays de la Loire, France
 Braine-l'Alleud, Walloon Brabant, Belgium
 Community of Communes Ackerland and Kochersberg, France

See also
Cégep de Drummondville
List of cities in Quebec
Municipal history of Quebec
List of mayors of Drummondville

Notes

References

External links

Ville de Drummondville

 
Cities and towns in Quebec